Marcel Granollers and Marc López were the defending champions, but they chose to compete in Acapulco instead.
Jarkko Nieminen and André Sá won the title, defeating Pablo Andújar and Oliver Marach in the final, 4–6, 6–4, [10–7].

Seeds

Draw

Draw

References
 Main Draw

Argentina Open - Doubles
2015 Doubles